JS Mochisio (SS-600) is the eleventh boat of the s. She was commissioned on 6 March 2008.

Construction and career
Mochisio was laid down at Kawasaki Heavy Industries Kobe Shipyard on 23 February 2004 and launched on 6 November 2006. She was commissioned on 6 March 2008 and deployed to Kure.

The vessel departed Wu on 31 May 2010 to participate in RIMPAC 2010 and arrived at Pearl Harbor, Hawaii on 21 June. She trained in the waters around Hawaii until 1 August, and returned to Kure around 27 August of the same year.

On 12 October 2011, she set sail for Hawaii via Guam for US dispatch training. The training was conducted from late October to mid-December, and returned to the port on 21 January 2012.

Gallery

Citations

External links

2006 ships
Oyashio-class submarines
Ships built by Kawasaki Heavy Industries